Epinotia piceicola is a species of moth of the family Tortricidae. It is found in Taiwan, Japan and Russia.

The larvae feed on Picea glehnii.

References

Moths described in 1970
Eucosmini